WKL may refer to:

 The World Kabaddi League, a professional sports league in punjabi kabaddi
 Weak Kőnig's lemma, the restriction of Kőnig's lemma to binary trees
 WKL0, a related axiom system in reverse mathematics
 Wolters Kluwer, an American and Dutch information services company
 WinKeyLess, referring to keyboards which lack a Windows key
 World Kiteboarding League